Asmodaios was a 19th-century Greek satirical newspaper published weekly in Athens.

History 
Asmodaios was founded in 1875 by the satirical writer Emmanouil Roïdis and the journalist and cartoonist Themos Anninos, and was published weekly until 1885 with only a small break in 1876.

The masthead featured a cartoon of the demon Asmodeus, playfully drawn as a combination of Cupid and satyr.

Content 
The paper was known for satire of a gentle, humorous sort without personal rancour, and Anninos' cartoons were widely recognised for their artistic quality. Contributors included  and Anninos' brother Babis Anninos.

References 

Newspapers established in 1875
Newspapers published in Athens
Greek-language newspapers
1875 establishments in Greece
Defunct newspapers published in Greece
Weekly newspapers published in Greece